Orłowice  is a village in the administrative district of Gmina Mirsk, within Lwówek Śląski County, Lower Silesian Voivodeship, in south-western Poland, close to the Czech border. Prior to 1945 it was in Germany. It lies between Mirsk and Świeradów Zdrój, on the Kwisa river.

The village has a population of 343.

History 
The village is first mentioned in 1373, when it was called Albrechtsdorf. In 1575 its name changed to Ullersdorf, in honour of Ulryk von Schaffgotsch. The village's paper mill is first mentioned in 1575, making it the oldest such mill in this part of the Sudetes.

A railway passing through the village was opened in 1909. The line was closed in 1997.

Trade and service 

They in village are:
kiosk 
two food shops 
shop with car parts 
shop with building parts 
bakery 
disco with club 
a small hotel and guesthouse
church

Industrial 
On west from village, at Zajęcznik (595 m) foot is quarry "Jerzy" state in which was mined. The factory of felt plates was in village second the largest industrial institution. This institution does not function at present (it was done away). It from acting at present in village of typically industrial institutions there is the sawmill.

Transport 
They through village lead two province roads:
 province road No. 361 
 province road No. 404

Railway line 
31 October 1909 was started railway Mirsk – Świeradów Zdrój (line D29-336) leading also by Orłowice. Last personal train (12 February 1996) arrived in direction Gryfów Śląski here. Till 1 January 1997 through village trains ran. This railway line be closed at present.

PKS transport 
The halt of PKS, thanks in village is also which from mighty village to approach with bus to nearby Mirsk not only and Świeradów Zdrój, but we can approach to distant ok. 70 km. of Jelenia Góra.

Villages in Lwówek Śląski County